This article is an overview of traditional and modern Japanese theatre. Traditional Japanese theatre is among the oldest theatre traditions in the world. In addition, there are many classical western plays and musical adaptations of popular television shows and movies that are produced in Japan.

Traditional forms of theatre

Noh and 

Noh and  theatre traditions are among the oldest continuous theatre traditions in the world. The earliest existing  scripts date from the 15th century. Noh was a spiritual drama, combining symbolism from Buddhism and Shinto and focusing on tales with mythic significance. , its comic partner, served as a link between the theological themes of the Noh play with the pedestrian world by use of theatrical farce and slapstick. Noh theatre was generally performed for the elite aristocratic class, but there were occasions where Noh was also performed for common audiences. Noh and  plays were performed together in series of nine, alternating between the two styles, with short  plays acting as interludes between the lengthy Noh.

Both men and women were allowed to perform  until 1430.

Kabuki

Kabuki combines music, drama, and dance, often using period-accurate costumes and intense choreography.

Kabuki developed out of opposition to the staid traditions of Noh theatre, a form of entertainment primarily restricted to the upper classes. Traditionally, Izumo no Okuni is considered to have performed the first kabuki play on the dried-up banks of the Kamo River in Kyoto in 1603. Like Noh, however, over time, kabuki developed heavily into a set art form, with importance given to preserving the integrity of certain plays, down to using the same costume designs used several centuries ago.

began in the 16th century. Medieval records prove the use of puppets in Noh plays too. The puppets were -tall, and the dolls were manipulated by puppeteers in full view of the audience. The puppeteers controlling the legs and hands of the puppets are dressed entirely in black, while the head puppeteer in contrast wears a colourful costume. The  player also has the shortest hair.

was a popular form of spoken theatre in the Edo period. Towards the end of the Edo period, there were several hundred theatres, about one per .

A number of variants existed:

Modern theatre 

In the post-war period, there was a phenomenal growth in creative new dramatic works, which introduced fresh aesthetic concepts that revolutionized the orthodox modern theatre. Challenging the realistic, psychological drama focused on "tragic historical progress" of the Western-derived , young playwrights broke with such accepted tenets as conventional stage space, placing their action in tents, streets, and open areas located all over Tokyo. Plots became increasingly complex, with play-within-a-play sequences, moving rapidly back and forth in time, and intermingling reality with fantasy. Dramatic structure was fragmented, with the focus on the performer, who often used a variety of masks to reflect different personae.

Playwrights returned to common stage devices perfected in Noh and kabuki to project their ideas, such as employing a narrator, who could also use English for international audiences. Major playwrights in the 1980s were Kara Juro, Shimizu Kunio, and Betsuyaku Minoru, all closely connected to specific companies. In contrast, the fiercely independent Murai Shimako who won awards throughout the world for her numerous works focusing on the Hiroshima bombing, performed plays with only one or two actresses. In the 1980s, Japanese stagecraft evolved into a more refined into a more sophisticated and complex format than earlier postwar experiments but lacked their bold critical spirit. In this time period, women began to run their own theater companies such as Kishida Rio, Kisaragi Koharu, Nagai Ai, and Watanabe Eriko.

Tadashi Suzuki developed a unique method of performer training which integrated avant-garde concepts with classical Noh and kabuki techniques, an approach that became a major creative force in Japanese and international theatre in the 1980s. Another highly original east–west fusion occurred in the inspired production Nastasya, adapted from Dostoevsky's The Idiot, in which Bando Tamasaburo, a famed kabuki  (female impersonator), played the roles of both the prince and his fiancée.

is a modern form of theatre. As a theatrical form, it was most successful in the early 1900s as the works of novelists such as Kyōka Izumi, Kōyō Ozaki, and Roka Tokutomi were adapted for the stage. With the introduction of cinema in Japan,  became one of the first film genres in opposition again to  films, as many films were based on  plays.

This usually meant amateur theatrical troupes making plays designed to be seen by anyone and everyone — not necessarily as meaningful in nature as they were simply entertaining. Some of the more philosophical playwrights and directors of that time are Noda Hideki and Shōji Kōkami.

Popular  theatrical troupes include Nylon 100, Gekidan Shinkansen, Tokyo Sunshine Boys, and Halaholo Shangrila.

Recently, new generation of  artists who are labelled as the "Generation of the Lost Decade" or the "Generation of 2000s" have emerged. Principal artists among this generation are: Toshiki Okada, Shiro Maeda, Kuro Tanino, Daisuke Miura, Tomohiro Maekawa and so on.

Western plays in Japan
Many classics of the western canon from Ancient Greek theatre, William Shakespeare, Fyodor Dostoevsky to Samuel Beckett are performed in Tokyo today. A large number of performances, perhaps as many as 3,000, are given each year, making Tokyo one of the world's leading theatrical centers.

The opening of the replica of the Globe Theatre was celebrated by importing an entire British company to perform all of Shakespeare's historical plays, while other Tokyo theatres produced other Shakespearean plays including various new interpretations of Hamlet and King Lear. The Globe Theatre, located in Shin-Ōkubo in Tokyo, now belongs mostly to Johnny's Entertainment and the promotion of pop idols in the acting field.

Yukio Ninagawa is an internationally known Japanese director and playwright who often turns to elements of Shakespeare for inspiration. In 1995 he performed the "Shakespeare Tenpo 12Nen", an interpretation of the wildly popular British theatre Shakespeare Condensed: all of Shakespeare's plays in two hours. Famous actors such as Natsuki Mari and Karawa Toshiaki were involved.

Popular entertainment in Japan

Theatrical revues
Outside of traditional theatrical entertainment, theatrical revues began to be recognized as popular entertainment in Japan during the early 1900s. Originating in the West, the light theatrical entertainment offered by theatrical revues inspired the creation of famed Japanese revue companies such as the Takarazuka Revue, founded by Ichizō Kobayashi in 1914, with a failed swimming pool in Takarazuka turned into a theatre.

Following the rise of Western and European culture influencing Japanese social, political, and economic culture, Japan's entertainment culture was additionally influenced. Within the popular entertainment of the Takarazuka Revue Company, its repertoire consisted of Euro-Western performance and musical styles alongside traditional Japanese performance elements. This would consist of Western and European stories (such as The Rose of Versailles), Western musical arrangements (such as CHICAGO), as well as the inclusion of traditional Japanese stories and music.

2.5D musical

2.5D musicals are stage adaptations of anime, manga, and video game series. While stage adaptations of anime and manga have existed since the 1970s, they gained popularity around the 2000s through Musical: The Prince of Tennis. Modern 2.5D musicals use projection mapping for backgrounds and special effects.

See also
Culture of Japan
Takarazuka Revue
GEAR, the first unlimited-run show in Japan with original contents.

Performing arts

References

  — Japan

External links
 Japan Cultural Profile – national cultural portal for Japan created by Visiting Arts/Japan Foundation

Japan
Japanese culture
Performing arts in Japan